The American Institute for Conservation (AIC) is a national membership organization of conservation professionals, headquartered in Washington D.C.

History 
The AIC first launched in 1972 with only a handful of members. Now it is grown to over 3,500 members in over twenty countries around the world.

Foundation 
The Foundation for Advancement in Conservation (FAIC) was incorporated in 1972 to support the charitable, scientific, and educational activities of the AIC. FAIC
receives donations and grants to undertake and underwrite efforts that advance the field of conservation, support AIC members in their professional endeavors, and help people care for their collections.

Publications and Resources 
The AIC publications include The Journal of the American Institute for Conservation, AIC News, and Specialty Group Publications.

References

External links 
 

Collections care
Museology
Heritage organizations
Organizations established in 1972
Professional associations based in the United States
Conservation and restoration organizations
History organizations based in the United States